Jamal al-Din bin Muhammad Saeed bin Qasim al-Hallaq al-Qasimi (1283 AH / 1866 CE - 1332 AH / 1914 CE) (Arabic: جمال الدين القاسمي), was the organizer of the story of Kalila and Dimna. He was one of the pioneers of the modern scientific and religious renaissance movement in the modern era of the Levant. According to his followers, he was one of the great Muslim scholars in the first half of the 14th century AH, and authored many valuable books that helped various scholars and students.

Lineage 
His full name was Abu al-Faraj Muhammad Jamal al-Din bin Muhammad Saeed bin Qasim bin Salih bin Ismail bin Abi Bakr al-Qasimi al-Kilani al-Hasani al-Dimashqi. He acquired the honor of lineage associated with being a descendant of the Islamic prophet Muhammad from both of the Prophet's esteemed grandsons (he was a descendant of Sheikh Abdul Qadir al-Jilani from the Hasan Sibt dynasty, and a descendant of the tribe of the Husseini Dasuqiya). His father, Sheikh Muhammad Saeed Al-Qasimi, was one of the sheikhs of science in Damascus.

Education and career 
The Syrian state assigned him to travel between Syrian towns and villages to give public lessons, and he remained in this work for four years from 1308 AH (1890 CE) to 1312 AH (1894 CE). After that, he visited Al-Aqsa Mosque in Jerusalem and Egypt twice, other Syrian cities, and Arab countries. Upon his return, he and a number of his friends were accused of establishing a new doctrine in religion, which they called Jamali school of thought, and he was detained in 1313 AH (1895 CE) in a major incident called the "Mujtahids Incident". He subsequently proved his innocence.

Despite this, Qasimi and his fellow Syrian Salafi reformists were subjected to censorship by the Ottoman authorities. Along with his fellow Salafi compatriot 'Abd al-Razzaq al-Bitar, Al-Qasimi went to Cairo in 1903 to meet Muhammad Abduh and Muhammad Rashid Rida. This encounter heralded the beginning of his correspondence with the anti-Ottoman scholar Rashid Rida, which lasted over a decade until his death in 1914. In face of severe censorship from the police authorities and official Ottoman clergy; Bitar, Al-Qasimi and Tahir al-Jaza'iri intensified their efforts by coordinating political activities and Salafi reformist endeavours such as calls for Arab revival, Ijtihad, etc. during the 1900s. The capture of Riyadh in 1902 by 'Abd al-Azeez ibn Saud provided a major boost to the Salafi reformists for expanding their cause of Arab revival. Appealing to popular themes of "Arab heritage", Al-Qasimi penned a major appraisal of Muhammad Ibn 'Abd al-Wahhab; acclaiming his efforts in eradicating superstitions and heresies from the Arabian Peninsula. Adopting the teachings of Ibn Taymiyya; he also espoused ideas critical of folk Sufism and practices such as intercession, tomb-visits, Taqlid (blind-following), etc.

The victory of Young Turk regime after the political crisis of the failed coup d'etat of 1909 led to the CUP consolidating its autocratic rule by pursuing a centralization policy. With the help of official clerics and Sufi orders co-opted from the previous Hamidian administration, CUP began to persecute Salafi reformists more harshly. Bitar and Qasimi were put to trial and implicated of numerous crimes such as treason, inciting separatist tendencies and plotting sedition with "Wahhabis". Following this, Qasimi forwent all his political activities and devoted his last years to teaching and transmitting the classical treatises of Ibn Taymiyya. Al-Qasimi devoted himself to composing and reading lessons. At home, he was committed to classifying and giving private lessons. In public, he held his lessons in interpretation, Islamic law sciences, and literature at the Al-Senaniya Mosque in Old Damascus. It was the same mosque that was led by his father and grandfather before him.

His books 
As a scholar, Jamal al-Din al-Qasimi published research in magazines and newspapers; he wrote many compilations in which he dealt with all aspects of religion, including belief, hadith, exegesis, jurisprudence, history, difference, and ethics.

The advantages of interpretation:

(Twelve volumes in the interpretation of the Holy Qur’an, as Professor Nqula Ziadeh said he spent fifteen years writing it, taking it in its solution and moving until it ended it - upon him be mercy - and he did not complete two studies in it. This is what Professor Muhammad Fuad Abd al-Baqi said - on them the mercy - and in the sentence this book did not. He writes something like it on the ground in his goodness, and Professor Mustafa Al-Zarqa used to say: Reading the beauties of interpretation needs an entire lifetime, so how about who composed it and had not reached the age of forty?)

 Evidence of Monotheism 
 Divan of speeches
 Fatwa in Islam
 ‘Iirshad alkhalq 'iilaa aleamal bialbarq
 Sharah liqutat aleijlan 
 Kalila and Dimna (organized by Jamal al-Din Qasimi)
 Criticism of adequate advice
 Doctrines of al'Aerab and philosophers of Islam in the jinn
 The sermon of the faithful summarized by the revival of the science of religion to Al-Ghazali
 Sharaf al'asbat
 Alert the student to knowing the imposition and duty 
 Jawamie aladab fi 'akhlaq al'anjab
 'Iislah almasajid min albade waleawayid
 Taetir almashami fi mathir dimashq alshshami (four volumes)
 Qawaeid altahdith min funun mustalih alhadith
 A Message in tea, coffee and smoke
 Credit shown to hold the precious substance (Explanation of Arbaeen Ajlouni)

Methodology of authorship 
His classification method was predominantly collecting and conveying, but with an elegant style, proper language and thumbnail, so that the notes that he gathered together appear as if they were a coherent array of knots emerging from a single source. His methodology in his compilations was expansion and encyclopedic, not specialization (which was a feature of his time) dealing with all the chapters of religion and its sciences, as was evident in all his books, especially his book on the term Hadith: The Rules of Modernization.

His reform call 
Al-Qasimi was influenced in his calling by the invitation of Muhammad Abdo and his friend Rashid Rida. He called for a renewal of the understanding of religion, for the reform of worshippers and mosques, for Islam to be a beacon of unity for all Muslims, so that they would not be divided by a contract or doctrinal dispute.

Al-Qasimi retained his Arab Eastern Muslim personality and was not influenced by Western civilization or by the revelers. He was also distinguished by the amplitude of his chest and the integrity of his pen from the accusations with which he was confronted by some of his enemies. And he kept himself from getting down to their level.

His Doctrine and Faith 
He was raised on the Shafi’i doctrine, and he declared his doctrine in many places, especially in times of his ordeal. He often asked about his doctrine and replied that he is familiar with Shafi'i who, with his tendency to strive and his blind tradition at the end of his life.

Sheikh Muhammed bin Sami Minyawi said in his letter: “The efforts and methodology of Sheikh Jamal al-Din al-Qasimi, may God have mercy on him, in calling upon God Almighty” that his jurisprudential views were inclined to the Shafi’i doctrine, and that he would win the Shafi’i saying if the evidence agreed with him. And they attributed it to Al-Shafi’i as usual. Sheikh Minyawi also said that at the end of his life he prevailed over diligence in matters of jurisprudence, looking at the evidence, and that he used to base his statements on what he preferred of them.

Al-Athar was his faith; it is the doctrine of the people of tradition, as is clear in his writings. It is the whole doctrine of ancestors as conveyed by the Golden Imam in the book Alau. Abu Alwaleed ibn Rashid said in the Methods of Evidence: "The people of Sharia law did not, at first, prove to God what they had done. The laws are all based on the fact that God is in heaven, that it is from him that the angels descend in revelation to the Prophets, that from heaven the books came down and the Prophet was the captors of God's prayer and peace." [prophets, and from the heavens came the books, and to them was the night journey of the Prophet, may God bless him and grant him peace].

His death 
Al-Qasimi died and was buried in Damascus in the year one thousand three hundred and thirty two Hijra (1332 AH/ 1914 C.E) due to severe typhoid. He had three sons and four daughters. Many of his students and brothers inherited it: including Rashid Rida, Mahmoud Al-Alousi, his brother Salah Al-Din Al-Qasimi, Khair Al-Din Al-Zarkali, Jarji Al-Haddad, and others.

References 

Syrian writers
Syrian scholars
Muslim writers
1866 births
1914 deaths
Salafi Islamists
Syrian Salafis
Salafi scholars
Sunni Muslim scholars of Islam